The Afghanistan men's national field hockey team represent Afghanistan in men's international field hockey competitions and is controlled by the Afghanistan Hockey Federation, the governing body for field hockey in Afghanistan.

Afghanistan has participated three times at the Summer Olympics where their best finish was in 1936 when they finished sixth.

Tournament record

Summer Olympics
1936 – 6th place
1948 – 8th place
1956 – 11th place

Friendship Games
1984 – 7th place

Central Asia Cup
2019 – Withdrew

FIH Hockey Series
2018–19 – First round

Western Asiatic Games
1934 –

References

Asian men's national field hockey teams
National team
Field hockey